The western woodhaunter (Automolus virgatus) is a species of bird in the family Furnariidae.

It is found in east Nicaragua, Costa Rica, Panama, west Colombia and west Ecuador. Its natural habitats are subtropical or tropical moist lowland forests and subtropical or tropical moist montane forests.

It was formerly treated as a subspecies of the eastern woodhaunter. The taxa were split as although they are similar in appearance, they have very different calls. When lumped the two species were called "striped woodhaunter".

There are four subspecies:
 Automolus virgatus nicaraguae (Miller, W. & Griscom, 1925) – east Nicaragua
 Automolus virgatus virgatus (Lawrence, 1867) – Costa Rica and west Panama
 Automolus virgatus assimilis von Berlepsch & Taczanowski, 1884 – east Panama to west Colombia and west Ecuador
 Automolus virgatus cordobae (Meyer de Schauensee, 1960) – northwest Colombia

References

Automolus
western woodhaunter